The 2016 St Helens Metropolitan Borough Council election took place on 5 May 2016 to elect members of St Helens Metropolitan Borough Council in England. This was on the same day as other local elections.

Election Results

Results by ward

Billinge and Seneley Green

Blackbrook

Bold

Earlestown

Eccleston

Haydock

Moss Bank

Newton

Parr

Rainford

Rainhill

Sutton

Thatto Heath

Town Centre

West Park

Windle

References

2016 English local elections
2016
2010s in Merseyside